Aleksandr Menshchikov (born 17 January 1974) is a Kazakhstani biathlete. He competed in the men's relay event at the 1998 Winter Olympics.

References

External links
 

1974 births
Living people
Kazakhstani male biathletes
Olympic biathletes of Kazakhstan
Biathletes at the 1998 Winter Olympics
20th-century Kazakhstani people